"Venus" is a song by Dutch rock band Shocking Blue, initially released as a single in the Netherlands in the summer of 1969. Written by Robbie van Leeuwen, the song topped the charts in nine countries.

The song has been covered dozens of times by many artists. In 1986, English girl group Bananarama covered "Venus" for their third studio album, True Confessions, with the single reaching number one in six countries. The composition has been featured in numerous films, television shows, and commercials.

Composition and recording

The song was written by Robbie van Leeuwen, Shocking Blue's guitarist, sitarist, and background vocalist. Van Leeuwen wrote new lyrics set to music based on "The Banjo Song" by Tim Rose and the Big 3, which is in turn lyrically a modification of the 19th century song "Oh! Susanna" by Stephen Foster. Influences from other songs include the opening guitar riff that is similar to The Who's "Pinball Wizard".

The song was recorded on a two-track machine in Soundpush Studio in Blaricum, the Netherlands. Van Leeuwen also produced the song.

In the Shocking Blue original version, the song's lead vocals were performed by Mariska Veres. The lyrics, however, contained a typo in the line "A goddess on a mountain top", with "goddess" written as "goddness", which was how Veres sang it on the record and on television. Later recordings by other artists corrected the word.

Release and reception
"Venus" was issued in the Netherlands in July 1969 as a single, backed with "Hot Sand", on the Pink Elephant label, a label specially created for Shocking Blue by Dureco. The song initially peaked at number three on the Dutch Top 40 on 12 July 1969, and remained at that position for a total of five weeks. It also reached No. 1 in Belgium, France, and Germany.

Jerry Ross, who was in Europe in the autumn of 1969 looking for European hits for release in the United States, was offered the song. He signed The Shocking Blue to his newly-created Colossus Records, and chose the record for release in the United States later that year. "Venus" reached number one on the Billboard Hot 100 on 7 February 1970, the first song by a Dutch band to reach No. 1. On 28 January 1970, it was certified gold by the Recording Industry Association of America (RIAA) for sales in excess of one million copies in the United States. Its success in the United States prompted further interest in other markets around the world in the 1970, and it reached No. 3 again in the Netherlands, as well as the top 10 in the UK. Its success also spurred interests in other Dutch groups. Worldwide, the single has sold over 5 million copies.

In 1981, it was used to open the "Stars on 45" medley. "Venus" was included as a bonus track on the 1989 CD reissue of Shocking Blue's second studio album, At Home, originally released in 1969.

Charts

Weekly charts

Year-end charts

Certifications and sales

Bananarama version

Background
"Venus" had been a part of Bananarama's repertoire for several years before they actually recorded it. The group's three members, Sara Dallin, Siobhan Fahey and Keren Woodward, had the idea of turning the song into a dance tune, but they were met with resistance from their producers at the time, Steven Jolley and Tony Swain. The group brought the idea to the production trio of Stock Aitken Waterman, and it became Bananarama's first collaboration with them.

The group had nearly completed recording their third studio album, True Confessions, with Jolley & Swain. Stock, Aitken and Waterman also resisted the idea because they believed that "Venus" would not make a good dance record. After persistence by the group, SAW relented. The track was initially produced in an arrangement more faithful to the Shocking Blue original, but was reworked in hi-NRG style after Siobhan requested it sound like Dead or Alive's "You Spin Me Round (Like a Record)".

Bananarama's "Venus" peaked at number one in the United States, Australia, Finland, New Zealand, Switzerland and South Africa, while reaching number two in Germany and the top-ten in Austria, Belgium, Canada, France, Netherlands, Norway, Spain, Sweden and the United Kingdom (number eight on the UK Singles Chart, matching the same peak of Shocking Blue's version). It also topped the US Dance Club Songs chart for two weeks.

The collaboration on "Venus" led Bananarama and SAW to work together on the group's follow-up album, Wow!, the following year.

A new mix of the song appeared as the B-side to the 1989 limited release "Megarama '89" in Germany and France. Bananarama has since re-recorded "Venus" for their eighth album Exotica (2001). It was later remixed by Marc Almond, with re-recorded vocals and included on their ninth album Drama (2005).

In 2021, British magazine Classic Pop ranked "Venus" number two in their list of "Top 40 Stock Aitken Waterman songs".

Music video
The accompanying music video, directed by Peter Care, with choreography by Bruno Tonioli, received extensive play on MTV and video channels across the world, and presented Dallin, Fahey and Woodward in various costumes, including a she-devil, a French temptress, a vampiress and several Greek goddesses. In one sequence of the video, Sandro Botticelli's painting The Birth of Venus is adapted as a tableau vivant. The video marked a pivotal shift towards a more glamorous and sexual image for the group that contrasted with the tomboyish style of their earlier work.

Track listings
UK / US / Canadian 7-inch vinyl single
UK: London Records NANA 10 / US: London Records 886-056-7 / Canada: London Records LDS 227 / Australia: Liberation Records LS 1789
"Venus" – 3:30
"White Train" – 3:50
S.Dallin/S. Fahey/K. Woodward/P. Bishop/P. Seymour
+ some copies released in picture disc format NANPD 10

UK / Australian 12-inch vinyl single
UK: London Records NANX 10 / Australia: Liberation Records LMD 474
"Venus" (extended version) – 7:23
"Venus" (dub) – 8:15
"White Train" – 3:50

UK 12-inch vinyl single #2
London Records NANXR 10
"Venus" (the Hellfire mix) – 9:20  #:remixed by Ian Levine
"Venus" (Hellfire dub) – 6:55
"White Train" – 3:50

UK 12-inch vinyl single #3
London Records NAXRR 10
"Venus" (the Fire And Brimstone mix) – 6:35  #:remixed by Stock, Aitken & Waterman
"Venus" (Hellfire dub) – 6:55
"White Train" – 3:50

US 12-inch maxi single
London Records 886 088-1
"Venus" (the Hellfire mix) – 9:20
"Venus" (the Fire & Brimstone mix) – 6:55
"Venus" (extended version) – 7:23
"Venus" (dub) – 8:25

CD video single
"Venus" (extended version) – 7:23
"True Confessions" (edit) – 4:09
"A Trick of the Night" (edit) – 4:07
"More Than Physical" (U.K. single version) – 3:40

Other versions
"Venus" (the Greatest Remix edit) – 3:40
Included on the 1989 U.K. CD single "Cruel Summer '89", remixed by Phil Harding and Ian Curnow
"Venus" (the Greatest Remix)  7:43
Included on the 1989 German CD single "Megarama '89", remixed by Phil Harding and Ian Curnow
"Venus" (2001 version)
Included on the album Exotica
"Venus" (Marc Almond's Hi-NRG Showgirls mix)  6:02
Included on the 2005 album Drama, remixed by Marc Almond
"Venus" (from the soundtrack Sugar & Spice: Stuck in the 80's)

Credits and personnel
Credits adapted from the liner notes of True Confessions.

 Stock Aitken Waterman – production, Linn 9000 programming (credited as "A. Lin")
 Matt Aitken – guitar
 Mike Stock – keyboards
 Garry Hughes – keyboards
 Tim Young – mastering

Charts

Weekly charts

Year-end charts

Certifications

BHF/Don Pablo's Animals remixes 
"Venus" was remixed and re-released by dance producers The BHF (Bisiach Hornbostel Ferrucci) Team in May 1990. Titled "Venus '90", the remix featured a hip house rhythm and samples. "Venus '90" reached number 78 on the UK Singles Chart and number 49 on the Australian ARIA Singles Chart. An instrumental version was also released independently under the producer's alias, Don Pablo's Animals, without referencing Shocking Blue. The instrumental version became the highest-charting version of the song, peaking at number four on the UK Singles Chart.

Other versions
Dutch DJ Pieter Gabriel remixed the song for the opening ceremony of The Grand Final of The Eurovision Song Contest 2021 held in Rotterdam in The Netherlands. The remix was used as a backdrop for the 26 finalists being introduced onto the stage in a flag ceremony.

Popular media
Shocking Blue's "Venus" was featured in the sixth episode of the 2020 Netflix miniseries The Queen's Gambit. The protagonist Beth (played by Anya Taylor-Joy) dances and sings to the music video. The scene takes place in 1967, well before the song was released in 1969.

Bananarama's cover of "Venus" was featured in the 2011 video game Just Dance 3.

The song was used in the commercial for Gillette Venus Women's Razor.

Bananarama's version of the song was used in an episode of the American animated show American Dad in which the character Roger uses it as the national anthem. He named the country after the group and afterwards the residents of the country danced to the song.

See also
 List of 1970s one-hit wonders in the United States

References

Bibliography

External links
 "Venus" at 45cat.com

1969 singles
1969 songs
1970 singles
1986 singles
Bananarama songs
Billboard Hot 100 number-one singles
Cashbox number-one singles
English-language Dutch songs
Classical mythology in music
London Records singles
Metronome Records singles
Minos EMI singles
Number-one singles in Australia
Number-one singles in Belgium
Number-one singles in Finland
Number-one singles in New Zealand
Number-one singles in South Africa
Number-one singles in Spain
Number-one singles in Switzerland
RPM Top Singles number-one singles
Shocking Blue songs
Song recordings produced by Stock Aitken Waterman
Songs written by Robbie van Leeuwen
Ultratop 50 Singles (Flanders) number-one singles
Ultratop 50 Singles (Wallonia) number-one singles
Venus (mythology)
Country rock songs